Ihab al-Ghussein is the current de facto spokesman of the Interior Ministry of the Palestinian National Authority based in the Hamas-administrated Gaza Strip.

He was involved in merging the Executive Force of Hamas into the Palestinian security forces which includes police, national and internal security, civil defense forces and firefighters. Al-Ghussein ordered the release of 150 prisoners who were members of Fatah and other Palestinian factions. During Israel's air strikes against Hamas government buildings in Operation Cast Lead, in which Israel said it killed Hamas operatives launching rockets, al-Ghussein replied that the killed were "Gazans at work, not activists launching rockets as Israel."

References

Hamas members
Living people
People from the Gaza Strip
Year of birth missing (living people)
Palestinian civil engineers
Islamic University of Gaza alumni